Charlottetown-Hillsborough Park is a provincial electoral district for the Legislative Assembly of Prince Edward Island, Canada. It was created prior to the 2019 election from parts of the former districts Tracadie-Hillsborough Park, York-Oyster Bed and Charlottetown-Sherwood.

The riding is located in the city of Charlottetown, and includes the neighbourhoods of East Royalty, Hillsborough Park and Falconwood.

Members
The riding has elected the following Members of the Legislative Assembly:

Election results

Charlottetown-Hillsborough Park, 2019–present
The district was excluded from the 2019 Prince Edward Island general election due to the death of registered Green Party candidate Josh Underhay on April 19, 2019. A deferred election was held on July 15, 2019. Nominated PC candidate, Sarah Stewart-Clark, withdrew her candidacy on May 26, 2019 for personal reasons. She was later replaced by Natalie Jameson.

Referendum and plebiscite results

2019 electoral reform referendum
The 2019 Prince Edward Island electoral reform referendum was held on April 23, 2019. Although the general election in the district was deferred, the referendum was not.

References

External links
Elections PEI: District 9 Charlottetown-Hillsborough Park

Politics of Charlottetown
Prince Edward Island provincial electoral districts